David I Westerhout (born 1936) is a former athlete who competed for England and a shooter who competed for Zimbabwe.

Sporting career
He represented England in the 440 yards hurdles at the 1958 British Empire and Commonwealth Games in Cardiff, Wales. He was a member of Woodford Green Athletics Club and headed the UK junior rankings for the javelin in 1954.

Westerhout changed sports and took up pistol shooting. He won the World Combat Pistol Championships in 1977 and was voted Rhodesia Sportsman of the Year. In 1980 he competed for Zimbabwe in the Mixed 25 metre rapid fire pistol at the 1980 Summer Olympics in Moscow.

Personal life
During 1959 he qualified as an optometrist and emigrated to Rhodesia. In the 1970s he served in the Special Forces Unit of the Rhodesian Army.

References

1936 births
English male hurdlers
Athletes (track and field) at the 1958 British Empire and Commonwealth Games
Zimbabwean male sport shooters
Shooters at the 1980 Summer Olympics
Olympic shooters of Zimbabwe
Living people
Commonwealth Games competitors for England